Nebo is an unincorporated community in Clay County, West Virginia, United States. Nebo no longer has a post office, which came under the aegis of ZIP code 25141.

References

Unincorporated communities in Clay County, West Virginia
Unincorporated communities in West Virginia